The Second Battle of Copenhagen (or the Bombardment of Copenhagen) (16 August – 7 September 1807) was a British bombardment of the Danish capital, Copenhagen, in order to capture or destroy the Dano-Norwegian fleet during the Napoleonic Wars. The incident led to the outbreak of the Anglo-Russian War of 1807, which ended with the Treaty of Örebro in 1812. The attack on Denmark, a neutral country, was heavily criticized internationally and in Denmark it is generally regarded as the first terror bombardment on a European capital.

Britain's first response to Napoleon's Continental System was to launch a major naval attack on Denmark. Although neutral, Denmark was under French pressure to pledge its fleet to Napoleon. In September 1807, the Royal Navy bombarded Copenhagen, seizing the Danish fleet and assured use of the sea lanes in the North Sea and Baltic Sea for the British merchant fleet. A consequence of the attack was that Denmark did join the Continental System and the war on the side of France, but without a fleet it had little to offer.

The attack gave rise to the term to Copenhagenize.

Background
Despite the defeat and loss of many ships in the first Battle of Copenhagen in 1801, Denmark-Norway, possessing Jutland, Norway, Greenland, Schleswig-Holstein, Iceland and several smaller territories, still maintained a considerable navy. The majority of the Danish Army, under the Crown Prince, was at this time defending the southern border against possible attack from the French.

There was concern in Britain that Napoleon might try to force Denmark to close the Baltic Sea to British ships, perhaps by marching French troops into Zealand. The British believed that access to the Baltic was "vitally important to Britain" for trade as well as a major source of necessary raw materials for building and maintaining warships and that it gave the Royal Navy access to help Britain's allies Sweden and (before Tilsit) Russia against France. The British thought that after Prussia had been defeated in December 1806, Denmark's independence looked increasingly under threat from France. George Canning's predecessor as Foreign Secretary, Lord Howick, had tried unsuccessfully to persuade Denmark into a secret alliance with Britain and Sweden.

On 21 January 1807, Lord Hawkesbury told the House of Lords that he had received information from someone on the Continent "that there were secret engagements in the Treaty of Tilsit to employ the navies of Denmark and Portugal against this country". He refused to publish the source because he said it would endanger their lives.

The reports of French diplomats and merchants in northern Europe made the British government uneasy, and by mid-July, the British believed that the French intended to invade Holstein in order to use Denmark against Britain. Some reports suggested that the Danes had secretly agreed to this. The Cabinet decided to act, and on 14 July Lord Mulgrave obtained from the King permission to send a naval force of 21 to 22 ships to the Kattegat for surveillance of the Danish navy in order to pursue "prompt and vigorous operations" if that seemed necessary. The Cabinet decided on 18 July to send Francis Jackson on a secret mission to Copenhagen to persuade Denmark to give its fleet to Britain. That same day, the Admiralty issued an order for more than 50 ships to sail for "particular service" under Admiral James Gambier. On 19 July, Lord Castlereagh, the Secretary of State for War and the Colonies, ordered General Lord Cathcart at Stralsund to go with his troops to the Sound where they would get reinforcements.

During the night of 21/22 July, Canning received intelligence from Tilsit that Napoleon had tried to persuade Alexander I of Russia to form a maritime league with Denmark and Portugal against Britain. Spencer Perceval, the Chancellor of the Exchequer, wrote a memorandum setting out the government's case for sending forces to Copenhagen: "The intelligence from so many and such various sources" that Napoleon's intent was to force Denmark into war against Britain could not be doubted. "Nay, the fact that he has openly avowed such intention in an interview with the Emperor of Russia is brought to this country in such a way as it cannot be doubted. Under such circumstances it would be madness, it would be idiotic... to wait for an overt act". Historian Hilary Barnes notes that Canning had no knowledge of the secret articles of the Treaty of Tilsit. He argues that Canning's decision was "rash, calamitous, and lacking in understanding of the Danes and of Danish foreign policy."

The British assembled a force of 25,000 troops, and the vanguard sailed on 30 July; Jackson set out the next day. Canning offered Denmark a treaty of alliance and mutual defence, with a convention signed for the return of the fleet after the war, the protection of 21 British warships and a subsidy for how many soldiers Denmark kept standing. On 31 July, Napoleon ordered Talleyrand to tell Denmark to prepare for war against Britain or else Jean-Baptiste Bernadotte would invade Holstein. Neither Talleyrand nor Jackson persuaded the Danes to end their neutrality, so Jackson went back to the British fleet assembled in the Sound on 15 August. The British published a proclamation demanding the deposit of the Danish fleet; the Danes responded with "what amounted to a declaration of war".

As the first move in the campaign a division of twenty-nine vessels under Commodore Richard Goodwin Keats was detached to the great belt with instructions to seal the island of Zealand off from Funen and the west. Within a week some 200 miles of coast had been secured and the Danish army in Holstein prevented from passing into Zealand to lend support. The city of Copenhagen was left to its own resources to defend itself from a British force of 25,000.

On 12 August, the 32-gun Danish frigate Friderichsværn sailed for Norway from Elsinor. Admiral Lord Gambier sent the 74-gun third-rate  and the 22-gun sixth-rate  after her, even though war had not yet been declared. Comus was much faster than Defence in the light winds and so outdistanced her. On 15 August, Comus caught Friderichsværn off Marstrand and captured her. The British took her into service as HMS Frederikscoarn.

Bombardment

The British troops under General Lord Cathcart were organised as follows:
 Cavalry Brigade: Major General von Linsingen, 1st, 2nd, 3rd Light Dragoons King's German Legion
 Artillery & Engineers: Major General Blomefield, 84 field guns and 101 siege guns
 John May's Company, 1st Battalion, Royal Artillery
 James Cockburn's Company, 1st Battalion, Royal Artillery
 Robert Birch's Company, 2nd Battalion, Royal Artillery
 John Taylor's Company, 3rd Battalion, Royal Artillery
 Charles Younghusband's Company, 3rd Battalion, Royal Artillery
 John Kattlewell's Company, 3rd Battalion, Royal Artillery
 Peter Fyers' Company, 3rd Battalion, Royal Artillery
 P. Meadow's Company, 8th Battalion, Royal Artillery
 First Division: Lieutenant General Sir George Ludlow
 Guards Brigade: Major General Edward Finch, 1/Coldstream Regiment of Foot Guards, 1/3rd Regiment of Foot Guards
 1st Brigade: Brigadier General Warde, 1/28th (North Gloucestershire) Regiment of Foot, 1/79th Regiment of Foot (Cameron Highlanders)
 Second Division: Lieutenant General Sir David Baird
 2nd Brigade: Major General Grosvenor, 1/4th (The King's Own) Regiment of Foot, 1/23rd Regiment of Foot (Royal Welsh Fusiliers)
 3rd Brigade: Major General Spencer, 1/32nd (Cornwall) Regiment of Foot, 1/50th (Queen's Own) Regiment of Foot, 1/82nd Regiment of Foot (Prince of Wales's Volunteers)
 4th Brigade: Brigadier General Macfarlane, 1/7th Regiment of Foot (Royal Fusiliers), 1/8th (The King's) Regiment of Foot
 Reserve: Major General Sir Arthur Wellesley
 Brigadier General Stewart, 1/43rd (Monmouthshire) Regiment of Foot, 2/52nd (Oxfordshire) Regiment of Foot, 1/92nd (Gordon Highlanders) Regiment of Foot, 5 coys. 1/95th Rifles, 2/95th Rifles
 KGL Division: Major General van Drechel
 1st Brigade: Colonel du Plat, 6th, 7th, 8th Line Batts.
 2nd Brigade: Colonel von Drieburg, 3rd, 4th, 5th Line Batts.
 3rd Brigade: Colonel von Barsse, 1st and 2nd Line Batts.
 4th Brigade: Colonel von Alten, 1st and 2nd Light Batts.

The Danish forces in the city amounted to 5,000 regular troops and a similar number of militias. Most of the civilian inhabitants of Copenhagen were evacuated in the few days before Copenhagen was completely invested.

On 26 August, General Wellesley was detached with his reserve and two light brigades of British artillery, as well as one battalion, eight squadrons and one troop of horse artillery from the King's German Legion (KGL) to disperse a force which had been sent to relieve the beleaguered city. On 29 August, at the rivulet of Køge, this significant British force swiftly overpowered the Danish troops, which amounted to only three or four regular battalions and some cavalry (see Battle of Køge).

The Danes rejected British demands, so the Royal Navy fleet under the command of Admiral Gambier bombarded the city from 2 to 5 September. In addition to the military casualties incurred by the Danish army, the bombardment killed roughly 195 civilians and injured 768.

The bombardment included 300 Congreve rockets, which caused fires. Due to the civilian evacuation, the normal firefighting arrangements were ineffective; over a thousand buildings were burned.

On 5 September, the Danes sued for peace, and the capitulation was signed on 7 September. Denmark agreed to surrender its navy and its naval stores. In return, the British undertook to leave Copenhagen within six weeks.

Ernst Peymann, the Danish Commander, had been under orders from the Crown Prince to burn the Danish fleet, which he failed to do, though the reason for his failure is unknown.

Thus, on 7 September Peymann surrendered the fleet (eighteen ships of the line, eleven frigates, two smaller ships, two ship-sloops, seven brig-sloops, two brigs, one schooner and twenty-six gunboats). In addition, the British broke up or destroyed three 74-gun ships of the line on the stocks, along with two of the ships-of-the-fleet and two elderly frigates.

After her capture, one ex-Danish ship of the line, Neptunos, ran aground and was burnt on or near the island of Hven. Then, when a storm arose in the Kattegat, the British destroyed or abandoned twenty-three of the captured gunboats. The British added the fifteen captured ships of the line that reached Britain to the British Navy but only four—Christian VII 80, Dannemark 74, Norge 74 and Princess Carolina 74—saw subsequent active service.

On 21 October, the British fleet left Copenhagen for the United Kingdom. However, the war continued until 1814, when the Treaty of Kiel was signed.

Aftermath

The news of what happened did not reach Canning until 16 September. He wrote to Rev. William Leigh: "Did I not tell you we would save Plumstead from bombardment?" One week later he wrote: "Nothing ever was more brilliant, more salutary or more effectual than the success [at Copenhagen]" and Perceval expressed similar sentiments. The Times said that the confiscation of the Danish fleet was "a bare act of self-preservation" and noticed the short distance between Denmark and Ireland or north-east Scotland. William Cobbett in his Political Register wrote that it was "vile mockery" and "mere party cavilling" to claim that Denmark had the means to preserve her neutrality. MP William Wilberforce said the expedition could be defended on grounds of self-defence. Thomas Grenville wrote to his brother Lord Grenville that he could not help feeling "that in their [the government's] situation we should very probably have given the same order without being able to publish to Parliament the grounds on which we had believed in the hostile mind of Denmark". Lord Erskine condemned it by saying "if hell did not exist before, Providence would create it now to punish ministers for that damnable measure".

The opposition claimed the national character was stained and Canning read out in Parliament the previous administration's plans in 1806 to stop the Portuguese navy falling into the hands of France. Canning and Castlereagh wished to hold Zealand and suggested that when the British evacuated it as part of the peace they should immediately occupy it again. This was strongly opposed by Sir Arthur Wellesley, however, and it did not happen. The opposition claimed that the attack had turned Denmark from a neutral into an enemy. Canning replied by saying that the British were already hated throughout Europe and so Britain could wage an "all-out maritime war" against France without worrying who they were going to upset.

The opposition did not at first table a vote of censure on the battle and instead, on 3 February 1808, demanded the publication of all the letters sent by the British envoy in Denmark on information regarding the war-readiness of the Danish navy. Canning replied with a three-hour speech which Lord Palmerston described as "so powerful that it gave a decisive turn to the debate". The three motions on this subject were heavily defeated and on 21 March the opposition tabled a direct motion of censure on the battle. It was defeated by 224 votes to 64 after Canning made a speech "very witty, very eloquent and very able".

The British bombardment frustrated the first attempt to publish a modern edition of the Anglo-Saxon poem Beowulf as the subsequent fire destroyed the 20-year work of scholar Grímur Jónsson Thorkelin. Two manuscripts, however, were recovered and Thorkelin eventually published the poem in 1815.

A horse foaled in 1808 (the year following the battle) was named "Copenhagen" in its honour, and was eventually sold to Wellesley and became his favoured mount, most notably at the Battle of Waterloo.

Danish privateers
Within one week of the British forces departing Copenhagen, King Christian VII's government promulgated the Danish Privateers Regulations (1807). Denmark was now at war with Britain, and a part of the Anglo-Danish conflict would be taken up by privateers.
Kaperbreve (letters of marque) were issued in Denmark and Norway from 1807 to 1813—copies of original letters of marque for the two ships Odin and Norges Statholder are included in this reference. Danish shipping companies donated suitable ships (brigs, schooners and galleases) to the state which could then equip the ships for their new privateering role. One such ship was the brig Admiral Juel which ranged the North Sea before her capture by the British off Scarborough.

Ships involved
One hundred and twenty-six ships, large and small, were involved at Copenhagen, included those named below.
In addition to those named here, there were another three dozen smaller frigates, sloops, bomb vessels, gun-brigs and schooners (e.g. HMS Rook attached to the British fleet), and a very large number of merchant or requisitioned ships carrying troops or supplies.

The following ships sailed with Gambier from England on 26 July 1807:
 Prince of Wales 98 (flag of Admiral James Gambier, 1st Captain Sir Home Riggs Popham, 2nd Captain Adam Mackenzie)
 Pompee 74 (Vice-Admiral Henry Edwyn Stanhope, Captain *Richard Dacres)
 Centaur 74 (Commodore Sir Samuel Hood, Captain William Henry Webley)
 Ganges 74 (Commodore Richard Goodwin Keats, Captain Peter Halkett)
 Alfred 74 (Captain John Bligh)
 Brunswick 74 (Captain Thomas Graves)
 Captain 74 (Captain Isaac Wolley)
 Goliath 74 (Captain Peter Puget)
 Hercule 74 (Captain John Colville)
 Maida 74 (Captain Samuel Hood Linzee)
 Orion 74 (Captain Sir Archibald Collingwood Dickson)
 Resolution 74 (Captain George Burlton)
 Spencer 74 (Captain Robert Stopford)
 Vanguard 74 (Captain Alexander Fraser)
 Dictator 64 (Captain Donald Campbell)
 Nassau 64 (Captain Robert Campbell)
 Ruby 64 (Captain John Draper)
 Surveillante 38 (Captain George Collier)
 Sibylle 38 (Capt. Clotworthy Upton)
 Franchise 36 (Capt. Charles Dashwood)
 Nymphe 36 (Capt. Conway Shipley)

The following vessels joined on 5 August off Helsingør:
 Superb 74 (Captain Donald M'Leod) (to which Commodore Richard Goodwin Keats shifted his flag)

The following further vessels joined on 7 August off Helsingør:
 Minotaur 74 (Rear-Admiral William Essington, Captain Charles John Moore Mansfield)
 Valiant 74 (Captain James Young)
 Inflexible 64 (Captain Joshua Rowley Watson)
 Leyden 64 (Captain William Cumberland)

The following vessels joined on 8 August or later:
 Defence 74 (Captain Charles Ekins)
 Mars 74 (Captain William Lukin)
 Agamemnon 64 (Captain Jonas Rose)
 Africaine 32 (Capt. Richard Raggett)

Lieutenant-General Lord Cathcart arrived in the Africaine on 12 August to take command of the ground forces.

Ships surrendered

The Danes surrendered the following warships on 7 September under the terms of the capitulation following the attack:

Ships of the line
 Christian den Syvende 84 – sailed to Britain, added to Royal Navy as Christian VII 80
 Neptunus 80 – sailed for Britain but wrecked and burned en route
 Valdemar 80 – sailed to Britain, added to Royal Navy as Waldemar 80
 Danmark 76 – sailed to Britain, added to Royal Navy as Danmark 74
 Norge 78 – sailed to Britain, added to Royal Navy as Norge 74
 Fyen 70 – sailed to Britain, added to Royal Navy as Fyen 74
 Kronprins Friderich 70 – sailed to Britain, added to Royal Navy as Kron Princen 74
 Tre Kroner 74 – sailed to Britain, added to Royal Navy as Tree Kronen 74
 Arveprins Friderich 70 – sailed to Britain, added to Royal Navy as Heir Apparent Frederick 74
 Skjold 70 – sailed to Britain, added to Royal Navy as Skiold 74
 Odin 74 – sailed to Britain, added to Royal Navy as Odin 74
 Justitia 74 – sailed to Britain, added to Royal Navy as Justitia 74
 Kronprinsesse Maria 70 – sailed to Britain, added to Royal Navy as Kron Princessen 74
 Prindsesse Sophia Frederica 74 – sailed to Britain, added to Royal Navy as Princess Sophia Frederica 74
 Prindsesse Caroline 66 – sailed to Britain, added to Royal Navy as Princess Carolina 74
 Ditsmarsken 60 – not sailed to Britain; deemed useless and burnt
 Mars 64 – not sailed to Britain; deemed useless and burnt on Saltholm
 Sejeren 64 – sailed to Britain, added to Royal Navy as Syeren 64

Frigates
 Perlen 46 – sailed to Britain, added to Royal Navy as Perlen 38
 Rota 40 – sailed to Britain, added to Royal Navy as Rota 38
 Freja 40 – sailed to Britain, added to Royal Navy as Freya 36
 Iris 40 – sailed to Britain, added to Royal Navy as Iris 36
 Najaden 44 – sailed to Britain, added to Royal Navy as Nyaden 36
 Havfruen 40 – sailed to Britain, added to Royal Navy as Hasfruen 36
 Nymfen 36 – sailed to Britain, added to Royal Navy as Nymphen 36
 Venus 36 – sailed to Britain, added to Royal Navy as Venus 36
 Friderichsstein 26 – sailed to Britain, added to Royal Navy as HMS Frederickstein 32
 St Thomas 22 – not sailed to Britain, but deemed useless and burnt
 Triton 24 (+6 howitzers) – not sailed to Britain, but deemed useless and burnt on Saltholm or the Swedish coast
 Lille Belt 20 – sailed to Britain, added to Royal Navy as  20
 Fylla 22 – sailed to Britain, added to Royal Navy as Fylla 20
 Eyderen 18 – sailed to Britain, added to Royal Navy as Eyderen 18
 Elven 18 – sailed to Britain, added to Royal Navy as Elvin 18
 Glückstadt 12 – sailed to Britain, added to Royal Navy as Gluckstadt 16

Brigs
  18 – sailed to Britain, added to Royal Navy as HMS Nid Elven 16
 Sarpen 18 – sailed to Britain, added to Royal Navy as Sarpen 18
 Glommen 18 – sailed to Britain, added to Royal Navy as Glommen 16
 Mercurius 18 – sailed to Britain, added to Royal Navy as  16
 Delphinen 18 – sailed to Britain, added to Royal Navy as  16
 Allart 18 – sailed to Britain, added to Royal Navy as Allart 16
 Brevdrageren 18 – sailed to Britain, added to Royal Navy as  12
 Flyvende Fiske 14 (brig-rigged cutter) – sailed to Britain, added to Royal Navy as  14
 Ørnen 10 (schooner) – sailed to Britain, added to Royal Navy as  12

Gunboats
 Stege 2 (gunboat) – sailed to Britain, added to Royal Navy as HMS Warning

There were a further 25 gunboats similar to the Stege, of which 23 were lost in the October storm in the Kattegat or destroyed rather than sailed to Britain. These lost were:
 Aalborg, Arendal, Assens, Christiansund, Flensborg, Frederiksund, Helsingør, Kallundborg, Langesund, Nakskov, Middelfart, Odense, Roskilde, Rødbye, Saltholmen, Staværn, Svendborg and Wiborg.
 The Norwegians or Danes recovered and returned to naval service six gunboats (Faaborg, Holbek, Kjerteminde, Nestved, Nysted and Nykjøbing) abandoned or stranded in the Kattegat.
 Stubbekjøbing had been destroyed at Svanemølle Bay on 26 August by mortar fire from the land.

Gun barges
Four barges (stykpram), floating gun platforms each with 20 cannon, were incapable of being moved far and so the British scuttled the barges during their brief occupation of Copenhagen. Of these four barges (Hajen, Kiempen, Lindormen and Sværdfisken) only Hajen was not raised and refurbished by the Danes after the British departure. A further "unsinkable" floating battery (Flaadebatteri No 1) of twenty-four 24-pound cannon was rendered inoperable and decommissioned the following year.

See also
 List of ships captured in the 19th century

Notes

Citations

References
 
 
 Major Francis Duncan, History of the Royal Regiment of Artillery, Volume I, 1879 London John Murray.
 Major Francis Duncan, History of the Royal Regiment of Artillery, Volume II, 1873 London John Murray.
 
 
 
  cites:
 
 
 
 
 
 
 
 J Marcussen for a private website listing all Danish merchant ships from the year dot. Listed alphabetically (nb: Æ, Ø and Å come at the end of the Danish alphabet)
 Individual record cards in Danish for ships of the Danish Royal Navy can often be found on the internet at Orlogmuseet Skibregister
 The Royal Danish Naval Museum website listing for ships is available here linking to a page of ships' names for which there is data.

The following website in Danish or in English gives the list of ships, as recorded by the Danes, "forcefully taken" by the British in September 1807 at Copenhagen. The references, in Danish, are as follows
 
  OCLC World Catalogue Number: 741989841

Further reading

External links
 The Bombardment of Copenhagen in 1807; by Jens Rahbek Rasmussen; translated by David Frost, British Ambassador in Copenhagen

Copenhagen
Copenhagen 1807
King's German Legion
1807 in Denmark
19th century in Copenhagen
August 1807 events
September 1807 events
1800s in Copenhagen